DD News is an Indian news channel of Doordarshan, it is India's only 24-hour terrestrial TV news channel broadcasting solely in Hindi, and formerly in English. The Prasar Bharati Board approved the proposal to start a 24-hour news channel in place of DD Metro, which was closing. This was subsequently approved by the Union Cabinet in a meeting held on 3 October 2003.

DD Metro was converted into a 24-hour TV news channel, into DD News, which launched on 3 November 2003. Its terrestrial reach is 21.6% by area and 44.9% by population of India.

In 2019, international sister channel DD India become exclusive channel for English News and Current Affairs from Doordarshan. After that parent body Prasar Bharati's CEO claimed that DD News will be "100% Hindi soon", but is yet to be implemented because of availability of content to be aired. Special feature of the channel includes a Sanskrit news show called Vaarta.

The DD News mobile app for Android and Apple was launched on 7 May 2015 by the then Minister of Information and Broadcasting Arun Jaitley. The app aims to instantly communicate news on a 24x7 basis.

History
DD News quickly gained popularity among the viewers, exceeding its commercial revenue target of Rs. 2 crores for 2003–04, and the channel earned Rs. 10 crores. The popularity of the channel amongst advertisers continues unabated and the revenue figures for the current year (04-05) have already crossed Rs. 10 crores. The main reason for this is that DD News is a free channel unlike the private and better channels that are pay channels.

India's public service broadcaster Doordarshan benefitted immensely from DD News's launch, as its in-house production churned out much quality content, achieving economies of scale.

Initially, after experiencing a partnership with CNN, Doordarshan launched a news and current affairs channel DD CNNi in 1995. DD was catering to an international audience via its DD International channel, and also providing English news, views, current affairs and infotainment programmings to Indian audiences via its DD3 channel. Its DD National and DD Metro channels were also delivering news content, and many private producers also had their news programs on DD channels. To encash all these, DD launched its DD News channel in late 1999, which failed due to lack of viewership and sponsors as it was not available on terrestrial mode. They converted it to DD Bharati on 26 January 2002.

Later DD again launched its DD News channel by replacing DD Metro in 2003 and assured its availability on terrestrial mode. DD News is India's only 24-hour terrestrial news channel. It telecasts over 16 hours of live news bulletins daily in Hindi, English, Sanskrit, and Urdu. Regional news units attached to different Doordarshan Kendras also telecast daily news bulletins in regional languages. News headlines and breaking news updates are regular features, and headlines are accessible via SMS.

DD News also carries financial information about stocks and commodities, accessing information from the National Stock Exchange of India (NSE) and the Bombay Stock Exchange (BSE) in addition to leading commodity exchanges including the National Commodity and Derivatives Exchange (NCDEX) and the MCX Stock Exchange.

In January 2019, Prasar Bharati Converted it into Complete Hindi News Channel, while DD India was converted into English News Channel.

Mobile application
Information and Broadcasting Minister Arun Jaitley on 7 May 2015 launched a mobile application of DD News and said the audience was extremely keen to have a comprehensive view of issues and events.

"The application will provide DD News a platform to instantly communicate news on a 24×7 basis and it has added a new dimension to its profile," he said, adding that the application will address the needs of viewers who sought information through the mobile phone.

See also
 List of programs broadcast by DD National
 All India Radio
 DD Direct Plus
 Doordarshan
 List of South Asian television channels by country
 Ministry of Information and Broadcasting (India)
 Television in India

References

External links
 DD News site, with live streaming
 11 years of DD News: Special presentation & discussion

Doordarshan
24-hour television news channels in India
Television stations in New Delhi
Foreign television channels broadcasting in the United Kingdom
Television channels and stations established in 2003
Direct broadcast satellite services
Indian direct broadcast satellite services